Rógvi Jacobsen (born 5 March 1979 in Klaksvík) is a former Faroese footballer who last played as a forward for ÍF. He is also the all-time top scorer of the Faroe Islands national football team.

Club career
Jacobsen played at semi-professional level for Icelandic team KR Reykjavík and Danish side SønderjyskE.

In August 2007 he went on a trial to Carlisle United. The trial did not end with a permanent contract so he continued playing with HB. In 2008, he signed a professional contract with Norwegian First Division side IL Hødd.

International career
Jacobsen made his debut for Faroe Islands in an August 1999, in a friendly match against Iceland. He is known for having scored a Faroese goal in the 1–2 home loss to the World Champions Italy. On 21 November 2007, he scored his 10th goal for the Faroese national team, in a 1–3 away loss to Italy, hence breaking Todi Jónsson's record, and became all-time leading scorer of his country.
He has 53 caps for the Faroe Islands national side and has scored 10 goals.

In 2007, Jacobsen was nicknamed Inzaghi Faroese by La Gazzetta dello Sport.

International goals
Scores and results list Faroe Islands' goal tally first.

|-
!scope=row|1
| 10 February 2002 || Tsirion Stadium, Limassol, Cyprus ||  |||||| Friendly
|-
!scope=row|2
| 7 June 2003|| Laugardalsvöllur, Reykjavík, Iceland ||  |||||| rowspan=2| UEFA Euro 2004 qualifying
|-
!scope=row|3
| 20 August 2003|| Tórsvøllur, Tórshavn, Faroe Islands ||  ||||
|-
!scope=row|4
| 18 August 2004|| Svangaskarð, Toftir, Faroe Islands ||  |||||| Friendly
|-
!scope=row|5
| 9 October 2004|| GSP Stadium, Nicosia, Cyprus ||  |||||| rowspan=2| 2006 FIFA World Cup qualification
|-
!scope=row|6
| 5 June 2005|| Svangaskarð, Toftir, Faroe Islands ||  ||||
|-
!scope=row|7
| 28 March 2007|| Boris Paichadze Stadium, Tbilisi, Georgia ||  |||||| rowspan=4|UEFA Euro 2008 qualifying
|-
!scope=row|8
| 2 June 2007|| Tórsvøllur, Tórshavn, Faroe Islands ||  ||||
|-
!scope=row|9
| 12 September 2007 || S. Darius and S. Girėnas Stadium, Kaunas, Lithuania ||  ||||
|-
!scope=row|10
| 21 November 2007 || Stadio Alberto Braglia, Modena, Italy ||  ||||
|}

References

External links
 Player profile

1979 births
Living people
People from Klaksvík
Faroese footballers
Faroe Islands international footballers
Association football forwards
Rogvi Jacobsen
SønderjyskE Fodbold players
IL Hødd players
Havnar Bóltfelag players
ÍF Fuglafjørður players
KÍ Klaksvík players
Norwegian First Division players
Faroese expatriate footballers
Expatriate footballers in Iceland
Faroese expatriate sportspeople in Iceland
Expatriate footballers in Norway
Faroese expatriate sportspeople in Norway
Faroe Islands youth international footballers